St Patrick's and Carriacou is a former parliamentary constituency in Grenada. It was established in 1924 and dissolved in 1935.

Member of Parliament

See also
Member of Parliament of Carriacou and Petite Martinique
Member of Parliament of St Patrick

References

Constituencies of Grenada
Carriacou and Petite Martinique